Goshen is a village in and the county seat of Orange County, New York, United States. The population was 5,777 at the 2020 census. It is part of the Poughkeepsie–Newburgh–Middletown metropolitan area as well as the larger New York metropolitan area.

The village is within the town of Goshen, some fifty miles northwest of New York City, on New York State Route 17 in the center of Orange County. Goshen is the home of the Harness Racing Museum & Hall of Fame, and hosted harness racing's top event, the Hambletonian, from 1930 to 1956, at the former Good Time Park. Racing is still held at the Historic Track, a National Historic Landmark in the center of the village.

History 
The village was settled in 1714 and incorporated in 1809. In 1727 it was declared the "half-shire town" of Orange County, a predecessor to its current status as county seat. It did not take on that full status, however, until Rockland County was split from the county in 1798, and Goshen was designated the seat since Orangetown was in the new county. For a while afterward it shared that status with Newburgh, moved into Orange as compensation for the lost territory, but since the late 19th century all county government functions have been centralized in Goshen.

Goshen was the site of the hanging of the famous outlaw Claudius Smith, a British Loyalist who— along with the Mohawk Indian Chief Joseph Brant— raided the countryside surrounding Goshen during the American Revolutionary War.  He and Brandt are said to have buried their many stolen treasures in the hills surrounding Goshen, and that Claudius is himself buried somewhere on the grounds of the old Presbyterian Church – with his skull having been embedded in the wall.  Smith was hanged on January 22, 1779, and exactly six months later, on July 22, 1779, Brant raided what is now Port Jervis. A militia from Goshen set out to stop Brant, engaging in the disastrous Battle of Minisink, in which 45 local militiamen were killed. A monument in the center of town marks the spot where their bones were buried in a mass grave 43 years after the battle.

As early as the 1750s, residents used to race their horses along what is now Main Street in the village's downtown. In 1838, a circular track was built around a nearby circus ground. This was the first incarnation of the Historic Track, where races are still held for one week each year, making it the oldest horse racing facility still in use in the United States. Later, the larger Good Time Park was built, which hosted the Hambletonian in later years. The Harness Racing Museum & Hall of Fame near the track recognizes Goshen's historic importance to the sport.

In the early 20th century, the village was the home of the Interpines sanitarium. In 1950, Goshen had a population of 3,311 people. By 1990, the village had been largely built out, and the number of people stood at 5,255; despite a building boom in the town, the village has remained about the same size.

Geography

Goshen's topography consists of a flat central area with gently rolling hills cresting at the village limits. The highest elevation is approximately 620 feet (189 m) at the USGS Murray benchmark on the eastern border; the lowest elevation is the Good Time Park site at 420 feet (128 m). According to the United States Census Bureau, the village has a total area of 3.2 square miles (8.3 km2), all land. Most of the village lies within the Moodna Creek watershed via its tributary the Otter Kill; a small portion on the west feeds the Wallkill River, and both streams eventually drain into the Hudson River.

Goshen was once located on the Erie Railroad Main Line across southern New York, which made a loop around Good Time Park through the center of the village; the tracks are gone but the right-of-way remains visible as the Heritage Rail Trail east of the village and Railroad Avenue within it. The former station has been converted into the village's police headquarters. Passenger rail service is available today via the Metro-North Port Jervis commuter line a few miles north of the village at Campbell Hall, on the Erie's onetime freight bypass.

The railroad has been replaced as the village's main long-distance transportation connection by NY 17, which ran through the south portion of the village and was expanded into a freeway in the 1960s. It will eventually be re-designated as part of Interstate 86. The western terminus of US 6 and NY 17M's overlap with Route 17 is at Exit 122 in the southwestern corner of the village; from there Route 6 connects Goshen to Middletown and Port Jervis while 17 continues to Binghamton and the Southern Tier. To the east, 6, 17 and 17M lead to the New York State Thruway at Harriman, with Route 6 continuing on to the Bear Mountain Bridge.

NY 207, the former Newburgh-Goshen Turnpike, begins at the interchange with 17 and becomes first Greenwich Street, then Main Street before leaving the village at the north end to continue across the county to Newburgh. South of 17 the same roadway becomes NY 17A, signed east–west but leading first south to Florida and then to Warwick. Two Orange County roads also connect Goshen to nearby communities: Orange County 8, named Sarah Wells Trail after a local pioneer woman, begins in the north of the village and parallels 207 to the south towards Washingtonville; and Orange County 83, Scotchtown Avenue, follows the old Goshen Turnpike to Scotchtown and later, Circleville.

There are three airports within a short drive of the village. Passenger flights leave from Stewart International Airport, near Newburgh on 207. General aviation uses Randall Airport, near the City of Middletown via local roads off Route 17 Exit 122, and Orange County Airport, near Montgomery via 207 and NY 416.

The triangular park at the village's central area, containing the landmark spire of First Presbyterian Church and the 1887 county office building, has been listed on the National Register of Historic Places as the Church Park Historic District. When first recognized in 1980, it included just the park, Webster Street and the Historic Track, but in 2004 its boundaries were extended to include many of the historic buildings on Main Street north to Erie Street and the block south of the park to Green Street. The village has designated it an Architectural Design District in its ordinances, to ensure that any new construction or renovation within it is in keeping with the area's historic character. Outside the historic district, the village's post office downtown and the Everett-Bradner and Wisner houses on South Street have also been listed on the Register.

The historic district mainly consists of churches, county government buildings and residences along the side streets. Much of Goshen's shopping district is located to its immediate south, in the blocks between Greenwich and West Main streets along the old Erie right-of-way. To its south, land use in the area along Route 17 reflects the proximity of the highway, with a small commercial strip along Matthew Street featuring gas stations and chain restaurants on the north side and an industrial park along Hatfield Lane paralleling the freeway to the south. The former Arden Hill Hospital sits on the high ground overlooking Route 17 in the village's southeast corner and John S. Burke Catholic High School, Orange County's principal Catholic high school, is located on Fletcher Street near the freeway in the southwest.

Goshen's northern section is dominated by the Orange County Government Center, a brutalist work by Paul Rudolph. Due to problems that have developed over the years with the building, particularly its many leaky roofs, it may be demolished. In the northeast corner is a large property that was formerly a school run by the Salesians of Don Bosco; the village has been converting it into a park since it acquired it several years ago. The northwestern area of the village is mostly residential, with the village's schools all located a short walk from each other and the district offices in an old high school building on Main Street.

Demographics

As of the census of 2000, there were 5,676 people, 2,039 households, and 1,227 families residing in the village. The population density was 1,770.5 people per square mile (682.7/km2). There were 2,150 housing units at an average density of 670.7 per square mile (258.6/km2). The racial makeup of the village was 87.53% white, 7.61% black or African American, .14% Native American, 1.55% Asian, .07% Pacific Islander, 2.26% from other races, and .85% from two or more races. Hispanic or Latino of any race were 7.63% of the population.

There were 2,039 households, out of which 29.8% had children under the age of 18 living with them, 47.3% were married couples living together, 9.8% had a female householder with no husband present, and 39.8% were non-families. 34.8% of all households were made up of individuals, and 17.8% had someone living alone who was 65 years of age or older. The average household size was 2.40 and the average family size was 3.14.

In the village, the population was spread out, with 22.3% under the age of 18, 8.9% from 18 to 24, 29.5% from 25 to 44, 21.1% from 45 to 64, and 18.2% who were 65 years of age or older. The median age was 38 years. For every 100 females, there were 102.1 males. For every 100 females age 18 and over, there were 100.4 males.

The median income for a household in the village was $50,922, and the median income for a family was $66,250. Males had a median income of $41,932 versus $31,711 for females. The per capita income for the village was $22,443. About 1.9% of families and 4.0% of the population were below the poverty line, including 0.8% of those under age 18 and 7.3% of those age 65 or over.

Government

The village has a mayor-council government that follows the same form as all other villages with that government in New York: a five-member village board consisting of a mayor and four trustees, all with equal voting power. The mayor is the village's chief executive and carries out all day-to-day management functions. The mayor is Scott Wohl and the four trustees are Tony Scotto, Chris Gurda, Molly O'Donnell and Daniel Henderson.

As with other villages in New York, all residents pay town taxes as well and are eligible to vote in its elections. The Goshen Central School District includes the entire village, and all of its four schools are located in it.

Fire protection is provided to the village by the Goshen Fire Department, an all-volunteer organization comprising three fire companies (Dikeman Engine and Hose, Cataract Engine and Hose and Minisink Hook and Ladder). Each of the companies are housed in separate modern fire stations located in the district.

Notable people
 Bill Bayno, former college and NBA coach
 Henry Lawrence Burnett, a Brevet Brigadier General in the Union Army, who was a prosecutor on the tribunal that convicted the Lincoln assassins, lived his later life in Goshen, where he died.
 Anna Elizabeth Dickinson, an abolitionist and advocate for women's suffrage (October 28, 1842 – October 22, 1932),  an orator, writer, actress, and teacher who lived in Goshen the last 40 years of her life.   
 Lauren Hough, Olympian  (equestrian, 2000) was born in Goshen.
 John McLoughlin, a survivor of the September 11 attacks, currently resides in Goshen.
Dale Memmelaar, (1937-2009) NFL Lineman Guard/Tackle, (played for the Cowboys, Browns, Cardinals, and Colts from 1959 to 1967)
 Howard Mills III, former assemblyman and US Senate candidate was born in Goshen.
 Horace Pippin, a painter, once dwelled in Goshen.
 William Henry Seward, Lincoln's Secretary of State, once lived in Goshen.
 Willie "The Lion" Smith, jazz pianist, born in Goshen, who has been honored since 2004 with the Goshen Jazz Festival.
 Noah Webster taught here in the 1780s. The local high school's library is named after him, as is Webster Street, where the town's offices are located.
 Henry Wisner represented New York in the Continental Congress, produced gunpowder for George Washington and his troops, and participated in efforts to block passage of the British along the Hudson River during the American Revolution. An obelisk in memory of him sits prominently across from St. James Episcopal Church and was erected in 1897.

Points of interest

External links

References

 
Villages in New York (state)
County seats in New York (state)
Populated places established in 1714
Poughkeepsie–Newburgh–Middletown metropolitan area
Villages in Orange County, New York
1714 establishments in the Province of New York